The Lancia Stratos Zero or Lancia Stratos HF Zero is a grand tourer concept sports car from the Italian automobile manufacturers Bertone and Lancia which was presented at the 1970 Turin Auto Show.

History 
The concept car was created by Italian designers Nuccio Bertone (heir to Bertone, which was founded by his father Giovanni Bertone in 1912, a rival of Pininfarina) and Marcello Gandini (chief designer at Bertone). They called it "Stratos 0" after the space-age stratosphere then in vogue at the time.

It was successfully used for marketing by Scuderia Lancia in relation with its Lancia Stratos (and GT Stradale road car) version which was produced in 492 units between 1973 and 1978, and featured a Ferrari Dino 246 GT/GTS (1969) 2.4 liter V6 engine for a power output of 142 kW (190 PS; 187 hp), which lead to a series of wins and domination of the world rally championships in 1974, 1975 and 1976.

Chassis and body 
The concept car was created by Bertone using the chassis of a crashed Lancia Fulvia HF1600 rally car.

Its angular trapezoidal ultra-futuristic science fiction design (for its time) styling is ultra low and aerodynamically shaped, with a height of only 84 centimeters. The bodywork is made of fiberglass, with an original copper color scheme, a fastback rear body shape, a retractable steering wheel for easier access to the cockpit, and a flip-open front-windshield door, and integrated bucket seats. The instrumentation was on a digital control screen, which was visionary at the time. 

The aeronautical design is inspired, among other things, by the supersonic planes of the time and by competing concept cars such as the General Motors Firebird III (1959), Chevrolet Testudo (1963), Alfa Romeo Carabo (1968), Alfa Romeo 33.2 (1968),  (1969), Autobianchi Runabout (1969) and Ferrari Modulo (1970). 

The Stratos Zero in turn may have inspired designs such as the Maserati Boomerang (1971), De Tomaso Pantera (1971), Fiat X1/9 (1972), Vector (1972), BMW Turbo (1972), Lamborghini Urraco (1973), Maserati Khamsin (1974),  (1974), Lamborghini Countach (1974), Lotus Esprit (1976), Dome Zero (1978),  (1980), DeLorean DMC-12 (1981), Peugeot Quasar (1984), Ferrari Testarossa (1984), ou Maserati Birdcage75th (2005).

Engine 
The Lancia Stratos Zero is driven by a mid-rear mounted  from a Lancia Fulvia HF1600 Rally, with a displacement of 1.6 liters and a power of 86 kW (115 PS; 113 hp).

Display 

The concept car was for long exhibited at the Bertone museum near Turin. It was sold at auction, among others, at the 2011 Concorso d'Eleganza Villa d'Este elegance competition, and has since been exhibited by its various successive private owners in various elegance competitions and car museums around the world.

Film 
The Lancia Stratos Zero appears in the 1988 musical film Moonwalker by Jerry Kramer and  starring Michael Jackson as the Lancia Stratos Zero.

References 

Bertone vehicles
Grand tourers
1970s cars
Lancia vehicles
Concept cars